Amelia Pinto (1876–1946) was an Italian operatic soprano who first performed at the Teatro Grande in Brescia in December 1899 in La Gioconda. She developed a particular liking for Wagner, excelling in Tristan and Isolda at La Scala. She is also remembered for her interpretation of Tosca, appreciated by Puccini himself.

Biography
Born in Palermo on 21 January 1876, Amelia Pinto was the daughter of Giuseppe Mancuso, a fencing master, and his wife Francesca. Thanks to her father who was interested in music, she took piano lessons as a child. In 1897, when she was 21, she began studying at the Conservatorio di San Pietro a Majella in Naples but the following year, her family sent her to the Santa Cecilia music school in Rome where she studied mezzosoprano singing under Zaira Cortini Falchi.

She made her début on 29 December 1899 at the Teatro Grande in Brescia where her dramatic qualities were noted as she sang in Amilcare Ponchielli's La Gioconda. The following February she took the role of Zuana in 's Tartini, o Il trillo del Diavolo. In September 1900, she proved to be a resounding success in Puccini's Tosca, capturing the composer's admiration. As a result, she was invited to perform the female title role in Wagner's Tristan and Isolda at its Milan première. Old recordings of her Isolda testify to the strength of Pinto's voice but also to her modulated and controlled penetrating treble.

In February 1901, at a commemorative concert for Verdi, together with Enrico Caruso, she sang in the Act II finale of La forza del destino. After a period in Argentina, that December she played Brünnhilde in Wagner's Die Walküre. In 1902, she performed in Tristan and Isolde in Ravenna before travelling to the United States with Pietro Mascagni's opera company to perform in Cavalleria rusticana and Zanetto. After performing in Palermo in 1904, she went on tour to Egypt, singing in Gabriel Dupont's La Cabrera. The following year she was first in Paris in Umberto Giordano's Siberia, then in Madrid in L'Africaine and La Gioconda. In 1906, in Santiago de Chile, she performed in Otello, Il trovatore and Les Huguenots. She retired from the stage in Madrid in 1916, after appearing in La Gioconda, Tristan and Isolda and Die Walküre

Amelia Pinto died in Palermo on 21 June 1946 after a serious illness.

References

1876 births
1946 deaths
Musicians from Palermo
Italian operatic sopranos
19th-century Italian women opera singers
20th-century Italian women opera singers